Radeau may refer to:

Ships
Radeau (ship), type of ship used in the early United States, mainly as a naval battle platform
The Radeau Land Tortoise (shipwreck), shipwreck found at Lake George (New York)

Arts
 Le Radeau de la Méduse, 1994 French film by Iradj Azimi
 The Raft of the Medusa, 1818–19 painting by French painter Théodore Géricault